Karl Julius Heinrich Lange  (13 April 1821 – 30 April 1893) was a German cartographer.

Biography
He was born at Stettin. He worked with Berghaus, and then labored three years in Edinburgh on Alexander Keith Johnston's Physical Atlas. Beginning in 1847, he studied under Carl Ritter and Heinrich Wilhelm Dove in Berlin. In 1855 he entered the employ of Brockhaus's firm at the head of the geographical department; retired in 1860; and in 1868 became inspector in the Berlin Statistical Bureau.

Works
 
He published:
 Atlas von Nordamerika (1854)
 Brockhaus' Reiseatlas (1858–73)
 Land und Seekarte des Mittelländischen Meers (2nd ed. 1870)
 Südbrasilien, die Provinzen São Pedro do Rio Grande do Sul, Santa Catharina u.Paraná with 26 illustrations/photos and 3 maps. (2nd ed. 1885)

Legacy
Lange Island and its southwest end, Lange Point, in Norway's Svalbard archipelago are named after Lange.

Notes

References
 
 http://paulodafigaro.blogspot.com.br/2016/04/as-imagens-do-livro-de-henry-lange.html

1821 births
1893 deaths
German cartographers